Lake Albert is a suburb of the city of Wagga Wagga, New South Wales, Australia, on the shores of Lake Albert from which it is named. The suburb has three schools; Lake Albert Public School, Mater Dei Primary School and Mater Dei Catholic College. The Lake Village Shopping Centre, built-in 1980, is located within the suburb and houses Foodworks supermarket and specialty shops. The area is family-friendly and is often used for outside physical activities, barbeques, and playing on the playground. Boats are able to enter the lake and water skiing is permitted. Around the lake are light posts donated by families and businesses around Wagga. This allows for activities to take place at sunset/sunrise. Exercise stations are scattered around the lake and are free for any given use. Water taps for drinking are available for human and animals (dogs). Two blocks of toilets opposite to each other are around the lake.

References

External links 

Suburbs of Wagga Wagga